is the name of a city in Hokkaido, Japan.

Ishikari may also refer to the following.

 Ishikari Subprefecture
 Ishikari District, Hokkaidō
 Ishikari Province, a former province in Hokkaido, Japan
 Ishikari River
 Ishikari Bay
 Ishikari Mountains
 Mount Ishikari
 Ishikari (train), a train service in Hokkaido, Japan
 JDS Ishikari (DE-226), a Japanese destroyer escort

People
 Taichi Ishikari, a Japanese professional wrestler